was a series of professional wrestling events co-promoted by Big Japan Pro Wrestling (BJW), DDT Pro-Wrestling (DDT) and Kaientai Dojo (K-Dojo) between 2007 and 2015. Tenka Sanbun no Kei was a series of tours in which BJW, DDT and K-Dojo held shows in the morning, afternoon and night at the same venue on the same day. The name "Tenka Sanbun no Kei" is a reference to the historical events surrounding the Longzhong Plan during the Three Kingdoms period.

First tour (2007–2008)
The first tour took place on October 7 and 28, 2007 and January 20, 2008 respectively in Fukuoka, Sapporo and Chiba.

October 7
The first three shows were held on October 7, 2007 at the Hakata Star Lane in Hakata, Fukuoka.

October 28
The October 28 shows were held in Sapporo at the Sapporo Teisen Hall.

January 20
The final stint of the tour was held on January 20, 2008 at the Chiba Blue Field (now the 2AW Square) in Chiba.

Second tour (2008)
The second tour featured six dates from October 12 to December 14, 2008. In addition to the three main dates in Sapporo, Kobe and Fukuoka, the tour featured three non-televised events held by the three promotions together.

October 12
The first date of the tour was a joint show held at the Tonyamachi Big Sight in Aomori.

October 13
The October 13 shows were held in Sapporo, at the Sapporo Teisen Hall.

November 23
The November 23 shows were held in Kobe, at the Kobe Sanbo Hall.

November 24
The November 24 show was a joint event held at the Kanazawa Ryūtsū Hall in Kanazawa.

December 13
The December 13 show was a joint event held at the Hiroshima Industrial Center in Hiroshima.

December 14
The December 14 shows were held at the Hakata Star Lane in Hakata, Fukuoka.

Third tour (2009)
The third tour took place on December 13 and 31, 2009 in Fukuoka and Tokyo.

December 13
The December 13 shows were held at the Hakata Star Lane in Hakata, Fukuoka.

December 31

The December 31 event was a special joint show subtitled "New Year's Eve Special" held at the Korakuen Hall in Tokyo. It was part of the series of New Year's Eve joint events that led to the creation of the  brand.

Fourth tour (2010)
The fourth tour took place on December 12, 2010, at the Hakata Star Lane in Hakata, Fukuoka.

Fifth tour (2011)
The fifth tour took place on December 11, 2011, at the Hakata Star Lane in Hakata, Fukuoka.

Sixth tour (2012)
The sixth tour took place on December 16, 2012, at the Hakata Star Lane in Hakata, Fukuoka.

Seventh tour (2013)
The seventh tour took place on December 15, 2013, at the Hakata Star Lane in Hakata, Fukuoka.

Eighth tour (2014)
The eighth tour took place on December 14, 2014, at the Hakata Star Lane in Hakata, Fukuoka.

Ninth tour (2015)
The ninth tour took place on July 5, 2015, at the Hakata Star Lane in Hakata, Fukuoka.

References 

DDT Pro-Wrestling shows
Active Advance Pro Wrestling
Big Japan Pro Wrestling shows